Since the Accident is the fourth studio album released by Australian electronic dance music group Severed Heads, first released in 1983. Released through Ink Records, it was the first major label release by the group. The album's lead single "Dead Eyes Opened" received critical and commercial success, peaking at #16 on the ARIA Charts. Throughout the years following the album's initial release in 1983, the recording has been reissued many times on multiple different formats through a variety of record labels.

Background
According to Tom Ellard, Since the Accident was initially a C60 cassette tape that was recorded around the time Garry Bradbury began to want to leave the group. The tape, which was packaged in a folder, was given to Dave Kitson, an associate of Ink Records, and after he listened to it on repeat during a 14-hour train ride, he decided to help release an abridged version of the tape via Ink Records. Originally, "Dead Eyes Opened" was only left on the original cassette to help fill up the remaining blank space on the tape, and the spoken word sample used in the song originated from the TV series Scales of Justice.

Reception

In the Juno Download review, Since the Accident was described as "one of Severed Heads’ finest moments". In Sounds magazine, the album was described as "essential alternative sound" and later as "gutsy, emotional and melodic". Tom Ellard expressed his distaste for "Dead Eyes Opened", calling the track "insipid".

Track listing
All songs written by Garry Bradbury and Tom Ellard unless indicated.
Original LP release:  UK (Ink, INK 2), Europe (Red Flame/Virgin, 206 176), Australia (Ink/Virgin, INK 2)

"Golden Boy" ends in a locked groove, which has been handled in subsequent reissues by shutting off the tape, fading it out and cutting in playing it on a copy of the LP for a few loops.

The Australian LP release starts side 2 with a lock groove of the beginning of "Wasps," which has only been reissued on the SevCom CD-R and Bandcamp downloads.  "Wasps" is an uncredited track on every release but the Bandcamp download.
The original cassette running order had two tracks removed to reduce it to LP length:  "Desert Song" (after "Golden Boy"), which was later re-released as a CD/download bonus track, and "Alaskan Polar Bear Heater" (after "Big God Sky," the original title of "Godsong") which was reduced to the first 4:47 and included on the 1985 UK double LP Clifford Darling Please Don't Live in the Past as "APBH No. 1" and the Nettwerk/Volition 1989 reissue CD/cassette as "APBH (Number Two)."

This CD was released without the consent of the band.  "Brassiere, In Rome" and "Wasps" were both on track 10.  11-13 were taken from the "Goodbye Tonsils" 12" single.  14-15 were taken from the "Dead Eyes Opened" 12" single.

"Wasps" is uncredited as usual, but this wasn't accounted for in the track numbering on the packaging and label.  One run of the CDs erroneously printed City Slab Horror on the spines.  Only tracks 12-15 were originally released on the 1982 cassette Blubberknife.  "Golden Boy Live" (from the Sedition performance in 1983) was previously unreleased.  "Desert Song" and the full-length "Alaskan" were released on the original cassette version of this album.

The CD-R release was packaged in a DVD case and included the Side One and Australian Side Two locked grooves (both recorded from a copy of the LP) as their own untitled tracks (7 & 8), which made Side Two 9-13 and the above tracks 14-17.  The Bandcamp reissue puts 7 & 8 into "Golden Boy" and "Godsong," respectively, making Side Two 7-11 again and the bonus tracks 12-15.  "Wasps" and the previously-unreleased "MoreNo" were not credited in the CD-R packaging.
In 2014, the American label Medical Records LLC reissued the LP in an edition of 1000 copies on half-black/half-white vinyl (MR-034).

Personnel
Tom Ellard - drum programming, synthesizers
Garry Bradbury - drum programming, synthesizers
Simon Knuckey - guitar [credited as Simon Insectocutor]
Stephen Jones - video synthesizer 
J. Mansfield - recording, engineering
Patrick Gibson - engineering, remixing
Marx Town & Country Plan - design
Severed Heads - design, composition

References

External links
 
 Bandcamp page

Severed Heads albums
1983 albums